Golden Mask may refer to:

Awards
 Golden Mask (Russian award), a Russian theatre festival and award
 Guldmasken (in English: The Golden Mask), a Swedish theatre award
 Masque d’Or, a French prize for amateur productions awarded every four years by the Fédération Nationale des Compagnies de Théâtre amateur et d’Animation
 Złota Maska (pl), a Polish theatre award

Film and TV
 Złota Maska, Polish film 1939, the title is translated as "Golden Mask"
 South of Algiers (U.S. title The Golden Mask (film)), a British adventure film 1953